William Watkin Hicks (born 1837) was Florida's State Superintendent of Public Instruction from March 1, 1875, until December 31, 1876. He served during the Reconstruction era.  He organized Black voters and reportedly told them to vote "early and often". He edited the Fernandina Observer in 1876 and 1877.

After J. C. Gibbs died in August 1874, Hicks succeeded him as Superintendent of Public Instruction. Florida Secretary of State Samuel B. McLin held the officer interim until he took office. Hicks was succeeded by W. P. Haisley.

He lived in Dade County.

References

Education in Florida
People from Miami-Dade County, Florida